Kyle Parker (born December 17, 1993) is an American soccer player who most recently played for the Wilmington Hammerheads in the USL.

Career

Amateur
Parker spent his youth career at Charlotte Soccer Academy.

College
Parker spent his entire college career at the University of North Carolina at Charlotte.  He made a total of 78 appearances for the 49ers and tallied 34 goals and 15 assists.

Professional
On January 14, 2016, Parker was selected in the second round (31st overall) of the 2016 MLS SuperDraft by Columbus Crew. He wasn't signed permanently by Columbus, and instead signed with United Soccer League club Wilmington Hammerheads on March 24, 2016.

References

External links
Charlotte bio

1993 births
Living people
American soccer players
Association football forwards
Charlotte 49ers men's soccer players
Columbus Crew draft picks
People from Union County, North Carolina
Soccer players from North Carolina
USL Championship players
Wilmington Hammerheads FC players